Jack Hart may refer to:

Jack Hart (state senator), American lawyer and member of the Massachusetts Senate
Jack Hart (rugby union) (born 1998), South African rugby union player
Jack Hart, ringname of Barry Horowitz
Jack Hart, known better as Jack of Hearts, a Marvel Comics character

See also
Jack Harte (disambiguation)
John Hart (disambiguation)
Jack Hart-Davis (1900–1963), cricket umpire